18 Delphini, also named Musica , is a single star in the constellation of Delphinus of the low northern hemisphere. It has a Sun-like golden hue and is faintly visible to the naked eye with an apparent visual magnitude of 5.506. The star is located at a distance of approximately 249 light years from the Sun based on parallax, and it is drifting further away with a radial velocity of +4 km/s. An object believed to be an extrasolar planet (designated 18 Delphini b or Arion) orbits the star.

Nomenclature
18 Delphini is the star's Flamsteed designation, abbreviated 18 Del. Following its discovery the planet was designated 18 Delphini b.

As part of the NameExoWorlds program by the International Astronomical Union, in 2015 the name Musica, Latin for 'music', was selected for this star by Tokushima Prefectural Jonan High School Science Club of Japan. The planet was given the name Arion, after a genius of poetry and music in ancient Greece. According to legend, his life was saved at sea by dolphins after attracting their attention by the playing of his kithara. The constellation 'Delphinus' is Latin for 'dolphin'.

Properties
The stellar classification of 18 Delphini is G6III, which means it is an evolved star that has cooled and expanded off the main sequence. It is a suspected red clump giant that is generating energy from core helium fusion. A moderate level of X-ray emission has been detected from this star, which suggests it has a mildly active chromosphere. The star is 650 million years old with more than double the mass of the Sun, and has expanded to seven times the Sun's radius. It is radiating 34 times the luminosity of the Sun from its photosphere at an effective temperature of 5,071 K.

The Washington Double Star Catalogue lists a pair of visual companions for this star. Component B is magnitude 9.88 and lies at an angular separation of  along a position angle (PA) of 162° from the brighter star as of 2003. The proper motion of both stars are diverging significantly from 18 Delphini, so they can be ruled out as physical companions. It is a small red dwarf star with a class of M4–5.

Planetary system
The mass of this exoplanet is greater than 10 times the mass of Jupiter.

References

External links
 

G-type giants
Horizontal-branch stars
Planetary systems with one confirmed planet
Delphinus (constellation)
Durchmusterung objects
Delphini, 18
199665
103527
8030